Les Dirouilles are a range of rocks to the North-East of Jersey. Historically and administratively, they belong to the parish of Saint Martin.

They have a large range of names, taken individually, and are also known as just Les Pièrres (the rocks).

References

External links
Les Dithouïl'yes with lists of names

Dirouilles
Dirouilles
Wetlands of the Channel Islands